NS Class 2400 designates two classes used by Nederlandse Spoorwegen (NS)

 , diesel locomotives built between 1954 and 1957. Withdrawn in 1991 ; some of them sold to France.
 NS Sprinter Lighttrain, multiple units from class 2400 and 2600 built between 2007 and 2012